Colle La Croce, or simply La Croce, is a mountain in the Marche, Province of Macerata, in the Monti Sibillini National Park, at 1623 above mean sea level.

Name
Colle La Croce is so named simply because there is a cross (in Italian: croce) at the top.

Near villages
Macchie is at the foot of Colle La Croce, but from its peak you can view Vallinfante.

Connections
Colle La Croce is connected to Macchie,  Passo Cattivo and Porche di Vallinfante.

La Croce, Colle